Belgian Pool is a hot spring in the Upper Geyser Basin of Yellowstone National Park, Wyoming. Originally named Oyster Spring, it was renamed after a visitor from Belgium fell into it in 1929 with fatal results. References to a "Belgian Geyser" in the 1930s may refer to this feature.

See also
List of Yellowstone geothermal features
Yellowstone National Park
Geothermal areas of Yellowstone

References

Geysers of Wyoming
Geothermal features of Teton County, Wyoming
Geothermal features of Yellowstone National Park
Geysers of Teton County, Wyoming